Agesander is a genus of short-horned grasshopper in the family Acrididae. It contains a singles species, Agesander ruficornis, found in northern South America. It was described by Carl Stål 1878.

References

Acrididae
Monotypic Orthoptera genera